Warehouse Records is a classic house record label based in Chicago, Illinois, United States.

The company was created by Mike Dunn and Armando Gallop in 1988. Together with Trax Records and DJ International Records, among others, Warehouse Records is the major and most important label records in the history of the Chicago house music.

Artists
 Armando
 The Chicago Bad Boy
 Paul Johnson
 Ron Trent

External links
Warehouse Records on Discogs data base

American record labels
Record labels established in 1988
House music record labels
1988 establishments in Illinois
Companies based in Chicago
American companies established in 1988